Aphelia euxina is a species of moth of the family Tortricidae. It is found in Bulgaria, North Macedonia, Greece, Ukraine and the Near East.

The wingspan is 12–17 mm. Adults have been recorded on wing from May to July.

References

Moths described in 1929
Aphelia (moth)
Moths of Europe
Moths of Asia